In the science of tephrochronology, the Saksunarvatn tephra is volcanic ejecta that formed an ash layer that is useful in dating Northern European sediment layers that were laid down during the Boreal period, the warm climate phase that followed the cold snap of the Younger Dryas as the earth made the transition from the last Pleistocene glaciation to the current interglacial, or Holocene. This was a period of rapid climatic transitions around the North Atlantic, some of which took place during a matter of decades. Similar effects are evident in independent palaeoclimatic reconstructions obtained from pollen zones, marine and ice-core records, but these sequences cannot be reliably calibrated with one another. The ash layer from a specific volcanic event, deposited simultaneously over wide areas, provides a common reference point or time marker called a horizon, which establishes simultaneity in the sequences wherever that layer is found: this set of techniques is called tephrochronology. 

Radiocarbon dating establishes a date for the Saksunarvatn tephra of ca 10.200 years BP calibrated, during the late Pre-Boreal climatic phase of rapid warming. The volcanic event happened on Iceland. The name commemorates the site where the ash layer was initially recognized, Lake Saksunarvatn on the island of Streymoy in the Faroe Islands, described by Waagstein and Johansen, 1968.

References
International Arctic Workshop, 2004. Stefan Wastegård et al., "Towards a tephrochronology framework for the last glacial/interglacial transition in Scandinavia and the Faroe Islands": (Abstract)

Tephra
Holocene volcanism